Fire Department Headquarters; Fire Station #2, at 1020 Central Ave. in Kansas City, Missouri, was built in 1905–06.  It was listed on the National Register of Historic Places in 1982.

It was designed by architect Albert Turney in Beaux Arts style.

References

Fire stations on the National Register of Historic Places in Missouri
National Register of Historic Places in Jackson County, Missouri
Beaux-Arts architecture in Missouri
Fire stations completed in 1905
1905 establishments in Missouri